is the second single by Japanese idol duo Wink. Written by Yukinojo Mori and Ken Satō, the single was released on September 7, 1988, by Polystar Records.

The single peaked at No. 30 on the Oricon's weekly charts and sold over 14,000 copies.

Track listing

Chart positions

References

External links 
 
 

1988 singles
1988 songs
Wink (duo) songs
Japanese-language songs